Gretchen A. Whitney High School, called Whitney High School or WHS, is a public school in Cerritos, California serving grades 7–12.  It is in the ABC Unified School District.
According to US News Report, as of 2022, Whitney High School is ranked 1st in the state of California and ranked 14th nationally among all high schools.

History
Whitney High School was founded on September 25, 1975 (under the name Gretchen A. Whitney Learning Center) as a community academic learning center. It was created by ABC superintendent Charles Hutchison, who envisioned Whitney to be a vocational school. The school refocused as an academic magnet/collegiate preparatory school. As a tribute to Hutchison, the current cafeteria is named the Hutch.

In 1997, half of Whitney’s parking lot was purchased by a housing contractor to build a gated community adjacent to Whitney.  In exchange, Whitney received funds to construct the long-awaited gymnasium. In 2012, Whitney built a multi-media arts center featuring computer labs, and a theater.

In 2018, Measure BB was passed. The school used the funding to provide for major technology renovations and the construction of a new science-focused building.

The school briefly went into lockdown on March 2023 due to a threat of a bomb in the school in a call to the local police department. No one was injured.

Entrance 
Entrance into Whitney is determined through mandatory placement testing. Students leaving elementary school are automatically tested, while students already in middle school or high school are required to take an additional writing test. Admissions are determined primarily through the California Assessment of Student Performance and Progress, with an additional criterion being the universally mandated essay examination.

Academics
Whitney's curriculum, as of September 2019 includes 15 Advanced Placement courses and 35 Honors courses, though students who attend Whitney High School are automatically placed in honors courses, except for math and physical education courses.

Rankings
In 1991, Whitney was recognized with the Department of Education's National Recognition Award as a Blue Ribbon School. Senator John F. Seymour spoke on the US Senate floor to recognize the school. Whitney is one of the three Blue Ribbon Lighthouse Schools Charter Members. The school was again honored as a Blue Ribbon school in 1998, 2003, 2008, and 2014. Whitney became the first school to receive 5 Blue Ribbon Awards.  President George W. Bush's brother Neil, co-founder of an educational software company, has visited the campus several times, as he put it, "because of the respect the staff has for students. I’ve never seen anything like it. Every school should be this way."

Whitney has been honored with the California Distinguished School title six times: 1986, 1990, 1992, 1996, 2003, and 2007.

In 2005, the Associated Press rated Whitney High the best high school in California, based on its Academic Performance Index (API) score.

Whitney High has been featured in a special report done by Fox News in 2005. The report on mentoring featured Whitney's "Big Buddy/Little Buddy" system. Furthermore, CBS News's "Weekend Journal" also reported on Whitney, focusing on the public high school's academic achievements.

In 2006, the school was on Newsweek’s "America’s Best High School" list. Whitney was not included in the top 100 high schools because "so many of [Whitney's] students score well above average on the SAT and ACT".  However, Newsweek did include Whitney in "The Public Elites" section, and labeled Whitney as "a comprehensive school for high performers". Newsweek again recognized Whitney in the May 23, 2007 "America’s Best High School" edition. Similar to the 2006 edition, Whitney was included as 1 of the 19 "The Public Elite" high schools and was labeled as an "award-winning school with special emphasis on college admissions".

The passing rate for the California High School Exit Exam (CAHSEE) for Whitney students is 100%. Whitney received a six-year accreditation from the Western Association of Schools and Colleges (WASC) in 2004.

Business Week declared Whitney as having the "Best Overall Academic Performance" in 2009 for California.

U.S. News & World Report ranked Whitney High School as the No. 12 high school in the nation in the November 30, 2007 edition. Whitney was ranked No. 10 in the December 15, 2008 edition. Whitney was ranked the 3rd best high school in America for 2010 in the December 10, 2009 edition. Whitney was 1st in the state of California for 2016, and rank 19th nationally. Whitney was 1st in the state of California for 2018.

Newsweek ranked Whitney High School as the No. 4 high school in the nation in September 2014.

Athletics
Whitney High is part of the CIF Division IV, and the mascot is the Wildcat.  In its earliest years WHS did not have any school athletics at all, and they gradually added small sports teams in later years.

Whitney High is now part of the newly formed 605 league, Division 3, CIF Southern Section.

Activities

The WHS Yearbook won First Place and Outstanding Theme at the 2013 American Scholastic Press Association Yearbook Competition.

WHS sponsors interscholastic sports and co-curricular activities including student government, service organizations, broadcast journalism, yearbook, marching band, drill team, pep squad. The school recently received funds to build a media center.

WHS's award-winning robotics team participates in FIRST: For Inspiration and Recognition of Science and Technology, an organization founded in 1989 by Dean Kamen and Woodie Flowers to motivate young people in their schools and communities to reach an appreciation of science and technology. Currently the team competes in the FIRST Tech Challenge (FTC), and FIRST LEGO League (FLL). Students also participate in outreach programs in robotics with local elementary schools, community groups, and summer RoboCamps.

Students have the opportunity to discuss and debate the most pressing national issues in the Junior Statesmen of America (JSA) program with other students from southern California.

"It's Finally Friday" (a.k.a. "IFF") is a televised show broadcast over the school's television network every Friday, from September 2003 and until June 2005, and brought back from 2006–2008.

The Whitney Independent News Network was founded during the 2009 – 2010 school year by teacher Eric Gutierrez.

In 2009, the school ceased publishing Aspects, the student newspaper. In 2018, the school newspaper was brought back by the Newspaper Club and is called The Wildcat's Tale.

"Whitney High School Live" is Whitney's news program that airs three times a week during homeroom. It began in the 2014-2015 school year and still runs to this day. It was founded and made possible by teacher Rod Ziolkowski.

School of Dreams
Whitney High is the subject of School of Dreams, a book written by the Pulitzer prize-winning journalist Edward Humes and published in September 2003.  Humes spent the 2001–2002 school year at Whitney teaching a writing workshop, and used his case study of Whitney High to bring national attention to the pressures endured by the students of America's magnet schools.

References

External links
 Official web site
 Whitney High page at BlueRibbonSchools.com 
 Newsweek America's Best High Schools

Cerritos, California
Educational institutions established in 1976
ABC Unified School District
High schools in Los Angeles County, California
Public high schools in California
Public middle schools in California
1976 establishments in California